Wolfgang Amadeus Mozart's Missa brevis in F major, K. 192 (186f), was completed in Salzburg, on 24 June 1774. It is scored for SATB soloists, SATB choir, 2 trumpets (which Mozart added later), 3 trombones, 2 violins, organ. AMA I/1 No. 6, NMA I:1/1/ii

The Credo of this mass features the "Do-Re-Fa-Mi" motif from the hymn Lucis creator, which Mozart later used as the main theme to the final of his Jupiter Symphony. Due to its repetition of this theme, it is classed as a Credo Mass; it is often known as the Kleine (small) Credo Mass to distinguish it from the Great Credo Mass, K. 257.

Notes

External links 
 

Masses by Wolfgang Amadeus Mozart
1774 compositions
Compositions in F major